The 2017 Interstate 75 rock-throwing incidents were a series of rock and sandbag throwing incidents from two highway overpasses by teenagers along Interstate 75 that caused two deaths in separate incidents in 2017: one in Michigan and one in Ohio.

Michigan rock throwing death

Other cars were also damaged by rocks a group of four boys were throwing. All of the teenagers were from the Clio, Michigan area.

Incident
The teenagers confessed to having thrown multiple rocks at cars driving south on I-75 from their position on the Dodge Road overpass in Vienna Township. They also confessed to playing a game called "overpassers" where hitting a car, which was called a "dinger," earned points. They competed in this for money.  The five teenagers had gathered large rocks, one weighing , from a dead-end street in Vienna Township, loading them into the flatbed of a pickup truck, before driving to the overpass where they were dropped onto cars as they passed below.

Arrest of the teens involved
After hitting the car, the teens fled the scene and ate at a local fast food restaurant. The next day, one of the teens was questioned at school but then released. On Friday, October 20, upon hearing about the victim's death, the 5 teens exchanged text messages, including ones that said "We could go to prison for life for this, everyone lay low and no one rat us out!" and "No one saw us, if everyone shuts up we won't get caught." The next day, October 21, the police identified the vehicle in which the teens fled. After identifying the owner, the police also sought evidence of who was inside it that night. After reviewing camera footage from the fast food restaurant where the teens ate, the police identified the five teens. The following day, Sunday, October 22, the police contacted the families of the five teens involved, informing them that warrants were out for their arrest. Since they were juveniles, the teens were not arrested, but were instead told that they would have to surrender to the police by 10PM that day. Kyle Anger reportedly attended church that day and had dinner at a restaurant with his family before surrendering to the police. All of the teens surrendered to the police by 8PM that day.

Victim
The victim, 32-year-old Kenneth White, was seated in the passenger seat. White, a construction worker, was riding with a co-worker.  The rock fractured his skull and chest and caused other facial injuries. He left behind his fiancée and his four children, the youngest being five years old.

Trial and convictions
The teenagers throwing rocks that night surrendered to police, were arrested and charged with second-degree murder.

Four of the five teenagers, who were part of the group throwing rocks at cars driving on Interstate 75 that night, accepted plea deals to a reduced charge of manslaughter.

In 2019, the judge rejected a request that they be sentenced as juveniles and ordered that the four be sentenced as adults. But the decision was overturned by the Court of Appeal. 

The individual (who was an adult at the time of the incident) who threw the rock that killed White (Kyle Anger) pled guilty to second degree murder. He received a sentence of 3 years to 20 years in prison, with credit for 740 days already served. He was released in January 2021 after serving 39 months in prison. The 4 other teens were all sentenced on August 4, 2021 to 1 year of probation.

Ohio sand-bag throwing death

Marquise Byrd, 22, a resident of Warren, Michigan, was killed on Interstate 75 on December 19, 2017 near Toledo, Ohio when four teenagers dropped a sandbag from a bridge onto the car in which he was a passenger.

The boys were crossing the highway on a bridge when they noticed rocks lying on the bridge, and decided to throw them at passing cars, and also threw two sandbags, running away when the second sandbag made a loud sound as it hit a vehicle. After Byrd's death, one of the teenagers, a thirteen-year-old, confessed to throwing the sandbag that killed Byrd.

Press reports compared Byrd's death to the death of Kenneth White two months earlier on the same interstate highway.

Victim
The victim, 22-year-old Marquise Byrd, was seated in the passenger seat.

Legal proceedings
The judge in the case, Denise Navarre Cubbon, initially sentenced the four teenagers to serve time at the Department of Youth Services. She sentenced three of the teenagers (14 at the time of the killing) to serve terms of four years, and for the thirteen-year-old throwing the sandbag to serve until he turned 21.  However, she suspended those sentences in favor of brief terms in the Lucas County Youth Treatment Center in the hope that clemency would prepare them to go on to lead productive lives.

Impact
As a result of this crime, fencing was installed along the overpass from which the sandbag was thrown to prevent future attacks. Furthermore, Ohio began to require fencing on highway overpasses to prevent deaths and injuries caused by youths throwing rocks at vehicles.

See also
 List of homicides in Michigan

References

Deaths by rocks thrown at cars
Manslaughter victims
2017 deaths
October 2017 crimes in the United States
December 2017 crimes in the United States
Interstate 75
Juvenile delinquency